John Keith Taylor (born 7 September 1935) was an English footballer who played as a centre forward.

Career
Born in Bradford, Taylor signed for Bradford City from 'minor football' in February 1956. He made 1 league appearance for the club, before being released later in 1956. He later played for Bradford (Park Avenue).

Sources

References

1935 births
Date of death missing
English footballers
Bradford City A.F.C. players
Bradford (Park Avenue) A.F.C. players
English Football League players
Association football forwards